The Prost–Senna rivalry was a Formula One rivalry between French driver Alain Prost and Brazilian driver Ayrton Senna. The relationship between the drivers was viewed by commentators as polarising and fierce, with confrontations between the drivers a regular occurrence.

As teammates, Prost and Senna won 25 of the 32 races held during the 1988 and 1989 seasons. Senna had 14 victories and 26 pole positions, whilst Prost had 11 victories and 4 pole positions. On the other hand, Prost amassed 163 (186) points, 25 podiums and set 12 fastest laps whilst Senna amassed 150 (154) points, 18 podiums and set 6 fastest laps. They each won one World Championship. After their time as teammates, Senna amassed 21 victories to Prost's 12. During the ten-year period (1984–1993) in which both drivers were active, Senna won three championships while Prost won four during the same period, including a one-year sabbatical by Prost during .

History
The Prost-Senna rivalry is widely regarded as one of the fiercest rivalries in Formula One to date, with both drivers often considered to be among the best to compete in the sport. It was at this point that the rivalry is said to have started, with Senna narrowly winning the  championship from Prost. This ultimately led to an intense manufacturer rivalry between McLaren and Ferrari.

Senna won the South American Kart Championship in 1977, with his success translating to the global karting arena, where he finished runner up in the 1979 and 1980 Karting World Championships. Senna would continue his surge to Formula in the corresponding years. Five years Senna's senior, Prost was born near the town of Saint-Chamond, close to the cities of Lyon and Saint-Etienne in France. Leaving school in 1974 to become a full-time racing driver, Prost went on to win numerous domestic and world karting championships, making his Formula 1 debut in 1980 for the McLaren team which was then run by Teddy Mayer.

Senna first came onto the Formula 1 scene following his performances in the British Formula 3 Championship in 1983. During this period, Williams, McLaren and Brabham all had Senna testing their cars. However, Senna failed to get a seat the following season with each of these teams, having to settle for a seat with Toleman who were into their fourth season and yet to complete a race higher than fourth place.

Despite Prost already claiming two Formula One World Championships, the relentless nature of Senna's driving style often challenged the calculated nature of Prost's style. Their contrasting approaches to racing, in combination with both men having a dominant car, it was inevitable that there would be highly controversial moments on and off the track. Throughout their time in Formula One Prost finished with 51 wins and 4 world championships. Senna, before his death in the 1994 San Marino Grand Prix had 41 wins and 3 world championships to his name.

Formula 1 teammates (1988–1989)

1988 season
The 1988 pre-season was rife with speculation around who would win the championship and what the driver lineups would look like. It was announced that Ayrton Senna would join the McLaren-Honda team, with Prost as his co-driver. Many expected Prost to dominate, however, the relentless nature of Senna and his knife-edge performances saw him win his first championship come seasons end.

The Honda-powered McLaren team dominated the season, with both their cars being far superior to the competing field, winning 15 of the total 16 races and the constructors' championship with a then-record 199 points. Senna specifically had a poor start to the season, with gearbox failure ending his home Grand Prix – the 1988 Brazilian Grand Prix – with Prost taking the victory. Senna recorded a total of 8 wins with 13 pole positions whilst Prost crossed the finish line first a total of 7 times with 2 pole positions to his name. These figures began to show Senna's single-lap dominance against Prost's calculated racing strategy.

Tensions arose towards the end of the season when Prost feared Honda gave Senna preferential treatment. His fears were later proven correct through a meeting with the head of Honda's R&D department, Nobuhiko Kawamoto who had noted that the Japanese engineers had an affinity with Senna's aggressive driving style. Honda and Senna had already developed a relationship in 1987 at Lotus-Honda. Prost was later promised a more transparent team approach, favouring equality between the drivers, however, this was not to be.

1989 season
The 1989 season saw Alain Prost claim his third world championship and last with McLaren, with the team also taking the constructors' title for the second consecutive year. The championship was decided in highly controversial circumstances at the penultimate race meeting of the year; the 1989 Japanese Grand Prix. Senna, needing to win collided with Prost during the final laps of the race, causing Prost to retire from the race, only for Senna to be disqualified after the race for re-entering the track incorrectly. This consequently handed Prost the title.

The 1989 season saw a host of regulation changes, the major of which was ending the turbocharger era in Formula One. New naturally aspirated 3.5 litre engines were to be used. Despite Ferrari winning the 1989 Brazilian Grand Prix, McLaren-Honda continued their previous season form. Both Prost and Senna traded wins throughout the season, with the Ferraris on some occasions managing to challenge the powerful Honda V10 McLarens. The first issues began to arise in the McLaren garage at the 1989 San Marino Grand Prix. Prost highlighted his discontent with Senna, resulting from an agreement in which whoever won the start off the line, would not be challenged into the first corner at Tosa. At the restart, Senna passed Prost into Tosa after Prost got into the lead from the start and went on to win by over a minute. Marlboro's John Hogan was in support of Prost's proposed agreement, with Senna denying such an agreement was ever made.

By the 1989 Italian Grand Prix, Prost had made his intentions clear for the 1990 season, by signalling his move to Ferrari. Prost would go on to win the Italian GP after Senna's engine blew up while in the lead. Whilst on the podium, Prost threw his first-placed trophy into the below Ferrari-fanatic Tifosi much to the distaste and fury of Ron Dennis and McLaren officials. Senna struck back in the Spanish Grand Prix, blowing away the field yet again, however needed to win the remaining two races to ensure a second world championship.

The 1989 Japanese Grand Prix remains one of the most infamous races in Formula One history. Senna took pole position, with Prost in second. Prost jumped Senna at the start and was leading into turn one. Senna fell back and positions remained unchanged. On lap 46 out of 53, Senna, desperate to pass Prost to keep his championship hopes alive, tried to overtake him at the last chicane, but Prost closed the door and the two collided. Prost stated that he did not believe he was responsible for the collision and complained that Senna's overtake was dangerous in attempting to go for a gap that was no longer there. After the collision, Senna had stopped off the track and waved the marshalls over to give him a push-start – within the rules if a car is deemed to be parked in a dangerous position. Senna re-entered the race via a run-off-road and made it back the pits for a new front wing, managing to re-take the lead in the final few laps, crossing the line first. A long period of silence ensued with podium regularities conducting without Senna. Senna was disqualified for re-entering the track illegally, meaning he was ruled out of winning a second title. Senna made a case to the Fédération Internationale de l'Automobile (FIA), however his case was dismissed swiftly. Senna would continue to protest throughout the off-season, with his ultimate battle just beginning to heat up.

Different teams (1990–1993)

1990 season
The 1990 Formula One season saw an intense constructor rivalry between Ferrari and McLaren-Honda, with Senna still at the helm of his Honda-powered McLaren and Prost newly seated in a Ferrari for the first time. Similar to the 1989 season, the championship came to its head at Suzuka. After Prost had mounted a significant title challenge in his Ferrari by claiming three consecutive mid-season wins at Mexico, France, and in the British Grand Prix. The championship would solely be between Prost and Senna for the third consecutive season. Senna, heading into the penultimate race of the calendar at Suzuka knew that any finish ahead of Prost, or if the pair were to crash out, he would be crowned world champion.

Senna, despite securing pole position, was distressed, complaining that the inside line whereby the pole-sitter starter was on the dirty side of the track. Senna protested with FISA president Jean-Marie Balestre that pole position should start on the racing line, however, Senna's pleas were ultimately rejected. An infuriated Senna vowed to attempt to take the lead no matter the cost heading into turn 1. Subsequently, Prost, starting on the other side of the track jumped Senna. Heading into turn 1 Senna dived down the inside of Prost's Ferrari, colliding and taking both drivers down the gravel and out of the race. Senna was crowned champion. With Benetton flooding the podium, it meant that the McLaren-Honda team would win its 6th Formula One Constructors' Championship. In heated discussions post-race, Prost revealed his disgust with Senna's tactics, publicly slamming Senna as "disgusting....and a man without value" claiming he almost retired on the spot.

1991 season

Retaining their successful driver lineup from the 1990 season of Senna and Gerhard Berger, McLaren were in the box seat for the 1991 season. The 1991 season saw Senna take his third and final world driver's championship, with McLaren-Honda taking out their fourth constructors' championship. Despite previous seasons seeing Prost and Senna consistently battle for supremacy, it would be Britain's Nigel Mansell who would come closest to challenging Senna for the title. However, Senna would dominate the first four races of the season, effectively clinching the title before the halfway mark of the season. Prost, despite his previous success was unable to win a grand prix in a calendar year for the first time since 1980. Ferrari struggled heavily throughout the season, the Ferrari 642 and its successor the 643 car were uncompetitive in terms of engine power or handling, failing to come anywhere near Williams or McLaren cars. The 1991 season also saw a number of rule changes with a win now worth 10 points, and every race result would count towards the championship compared to previous seasons, where the best 11 races were only counted.

With little competition throughout, Senna, with his consistent and relentless pace claimed the championship with 96 points to Mansell's 72. Prost was dropped from his seat for the final race of the season due to a strong falling out with Ferrari bosses, after he described the Ferrari car as a 'truck' and publicly mocking and criticised the Ferrari team performance.

1992–1993 seasons
The 1992 Formula One season saw the end of the dominant McLaren period, with Williams' Nigel Mansell becoming the first British driver since James Hunt to win a Formula One World Championship. Despite managing three race wins, Senna could only manage fourth place in the driver standings come season's end. Prost took a year off from racing following his well-publicised falling out with Ferrari. The 1993 Formula One season saw Prost return to the grid and eventually taking out his fourth drivers' championship, with Senna a close second driving a Ford-powered McLaren. Prost's championship win saw him signalling for retirement, with Senna seeking new pastures from his underperforming McLaren.

Results comparison

Overall summary

As teammates

Summary

* Only the best 11 results each season counted towards the championship. Numbers without parentheses are championship points. Numbers in parentheses are total points scored.

Complete results

1988 season

* Only the best 11 results counted towards the championship. Numbers without parentheses are championship points. Numbers in parentheses are total points scored.

1989 season

* Only the best 11 results counted towards the championship. Numbers without parentheses are championship points. Numbers in parentheses are total points scored.

Legacy between the drivers

Considered by many to be one of the greatest Formula One rivalries, Prost and Senna remain influential figures in the world of motorsport to this day. Senna is widely regarded a once in a generation driver and was considered to be the benchmark for racing drivers around the world. However, in a somewhat complementary regard, Alain Prost's tactical and methodical approach to racing allowed him to compete successfully against Senna. Prost was able to face setbacks and still win races. Some considered Prost to exemplify a level of professionalism perhaps greater than Senna did, recognising key moments on which to capitalise. A mathematical model concluded that Prost, overall, had the more impressive results. However, it was also noted that Senna was generally higher ranked in fan and expert polls.  

However, Senna was killed in the early stages of the 1994 San Marino Grand Prix when his Williams collided at high speed with a barrier at the Tamburello corner.

Prost and Senna had reconciled their relationship, as seen via an onboard lap with Senna, who was quoted as saying "A special hello to our dear friend Alain. We all miss you, Alain." Prost was touched by Senna's words. The pair had agreed to meet before Monaco to discuss safety and regulation changes in the sport.

See also
 List of sports rivalries
 Senna (film)

Notes

References

Formula One rivalries
Ayrton Senna
Senna rivalry